The Zeitschrift für Philosophie und philosophische Kritik was an academic journal. It was established in 1837 by editor-in-chief Immanuel Hermann Fichte as Zeitschrift für Philosophie und spekulative Theologie and renamed in 1847. Notable early contributors included Christian Hermann Weisse.

Publication was suspended from 1848 to 1852, after which Hermann Ulrici and  joined Fichte as editors. The journal served as an outlet for Fichte's views, especially about the philosophy of religion. It was published by Pfeffer in Halle (Saale) and Haacke in Leipzig.  The last volume (165) was issued in 1918.

Notable articles 
 Georg Cantor's first statement of the Cantor–Bernstein–Schröder theorem, vol. 91, 1887, pp. 81–125.
 Gottlob Frege, "Über Sinn und Bedeutung" ("On Sense and Reference"), vol. 100, pp. 25–50.

Sources 
 

Philosophy journals
Publications established in 1837
Publications disestablished in 1918
German-language journals
1837 establishments in Germany